Guaranteed is Ronnie Drew's second solo album that was released in 1978 and produced by Pete St. John, who wrote many of the featured tracks. Eamonn Campbell featured both as musician and musical director and John Sheahan also played on the album.  Guaranteed featured many songs that Drew would later record with The Dubliners, as well as tracks he had previously recorded. But there were other tracks featured which cannot be heard anywhere else. Ronnie Drew's spoken passages, extracts from Peter St. John's song "The Mero" and the instrumental "Dublin City Theme" link many of the tracks.

In 1998, the album was reissued on CD as "Guaranteed Dubliner". Below is the track listing for the CD, which consists of seventeen tracks. Although the tracks are written as their original eight track format and the others are just untititled tracks, the original LP is split into seventeen tracks to fit on to the CD.

Track listing
 "Dublin City Theme"
 "The Mero"
 "Hey Johnny McGorry"
 "Gas From a Burner"
 "Easy and Slow" 
 "The Second World Song"
 "Gunner McGee"
 "Peace/And The Band Played Waltzing Matilda"
 "The Mero-Reprise"
 "O'Duffy's Ironsides"
 "D'You Remember Jem?"
 "Barney Brown"
 "Come And Join The British Army"
 "The Captains and The Kings"
 "Dandelion Market/The Departed Man"
 "Danny Farrell"
 "The Mero-Finale"

Personnel
Ronnie Drew - spoken and sung vocals, flamenco guitar
Eamonn Campbell - guitar, banjo, mandolin, musical director
Des Moore - guitar, classical guitar
John Drummond - fretless bass
Eddie Fury - bodhrán
John Sheahan - whistle, fiddle, mandolin
Paddy Roach - harmonica

1978 albums
Ronnie Drew albums